Smaalenene Medier AS is a Norwegian media company. Owned 100% by A-pressen, it publishes the Askim-based newspaper Smaalenenes Avis, and has a 100% ownership of Enebakk Avis, Vestby Avis and Ås Avis. It also owns 6.9% of the local television station TV Østfold.

Before 2001, A-pressen only owned 49%.

References

Mass media in Askim
Companies based in Østfold
Mass media companies of Norway